Palagruža is a small Croatian archipelago in the middle of the Adriatic Sea. It is uninhabited, except by lighthouse staff and occasional summer tourists.

Geography

It consists of one larger island, called Vela or Velika ('Great') Palagruža, and a smaller one, Mala ('Little') Palagruža, as well as a dozen nearby rocks and reefs composed of dolomite. All the main islets are in the form of steep ridges.

It is visible from land only from other remote islands of Italy and Croatia. Palagruža is further south than the mainland peninsula of Prevlaka, making it the southernmost point of Croatia.

Palagruža can be reached only by a chartered motorboat, requiring a journey of several hours from the nearby islands like Lastovo, Korčula or Vis. It is administratively part of the municipality of Komiža.

Name
The place is known in Italian as Pelagosa, derived from Ancient Greek Pelagousae ('sea'). This is the source of the current Croatian name, as well as of the name of pelagosite. Gruž also means 'ballast' in Croatian, and the term is therefore well known in two ways to seafarers.

The islands are also associated with the Greek mythology Diomedia or Islands of Diomedes.

History

Authentic archaeological finds of the Neolithic period have been found on Palagruža - a small number of early Neolithic Impressed Ware pottery dated to 6th to 4th millennium BCE as well as a larger amount of Ljubljana-Adriatic culture (first half of the 3rd millennium BC) and
Cetina culture finds (latter half of the 3rd millennium BC).

Human presence artifacts on Palagruža from the 2nd millennium BC are more rare, but then there are large finds from ancient Greek seafarers, including Late Archaic, Classical, Hellenistic and Early Roman periods. There are also recorded archaeological finds from Late Roman and early medieval periods.

Palagruža is associated with the Island of Diomedes, a location named after the Homeric hero Diomedes, who is reputed to be buried here, though it is hard to imagine where. Speculation is fueled by the discovery of a painted 6th-century BC Greek potsherd with the name Diomed[es] on it, making a shrine by the Cult of Diomedes on Palagruža seem plausible.

It is recorded that the galley-fleet of Pope Alexander III landed on Palagruža on 9 March 1177.

The archipelago is found on maps from the start of the 14th century, as Pelagosa, Pellegoxa and Pelogosa.

In the 15th and 16th centuries, there was a rise in fishing in the area, making the island the centre of a traditional fishing-ground of the community of Komiža, island of Vis, Croatia.

Before 1861, the islands belonged to the Kingdom of the Two Sicilies, and after 1861 therefore to the Kingdom of Italy, but was unilaterally occupied by Austria-Hungary in 1873, without any declaration of war. The first action of the new authorities was to build the important lighthouse mentioned above, in 1875.

After Italy's entry into the First World War, the country's armed forces occupied the island. Italy's Regia Marina submarine Nereide was sunk there on the 5th of August 1915 by Austria-Hungary's Imperial and Royal War Navy submarine U-5.

It reverted to Italy between the two World Wars, as part of the Province of Zara (now Zadar, Croatia), and was ceded to Yugoslavia in 1947. Since the break-up of Yugoslavia, it has formed part of the sovereign country of Croatia.

Topography, economy and ecology
Palagruža is surrounded by dangerous waters, and landing can be difficult. It is uninhabited, except by lighthouse staff and by summer tourists who occupy two units of residential accommodation. There is one beach of golden sand. The lighthouse is also the site of a meteorological station. Other important islands in this archipelago are Mala Palagruža, Galijula and Kamik od Tramuntane

Palagruža sits in the heart of fish-rich seas, including spawning grounds of sardines.  It is a nature reserve, and the small amount of vegetation is of the Mediterranean type, for instance oleander (Nerium oleander) and tree spurge (Euphorbia dendroides). There are endemic plant species including a type of knapweed, Centaurea friderici Vis. (Palagruška zečina ). The algae, and their role in the production of the local mineral pelagosite, have been the subject of academic study (Montanari et al. 2007). The distinctive local fauna, including the black lizard now classed as Podarcis melisellenis ssp. fiumana and the related Podarcis sicula ssp. pelagosana (primorska gušterica in Croatian), was mentioned first by Babić and Rössler (1912).

Geology
Velika Palagruža is an apical part of subsurface geological complex, composed of carbonate, siliciclastic and evaporite rocks of different ages, ranging from Triassic (approx. 220 mil. years ago), through Miocene (approx. 10 mil. years ago), to Quaternary (recent deposition).

Climate

Palagruža has a weather station, established in 1894, which represents a major indicator of weather, especially wind, waves and precipitation on the open Adriatic. Weather conditions on the central Adriatic are dictated by movements of low-pressure area, which causes frequent changes of bora and scirocco (jugo) winds. Annually, Palagruža Island has 104 days with strong (6-7 Bf), and 21 days with stormy winds (>8 Bf).

Due to its remote position in the middle of the sea, Palagruža exhibits more Mediterranean climate features than the Croatian coast. Summers are sunny and dry, while most of the rain falls in winter months. There are 2620 sunshine hours annually (1961–1990 average).

Flora and fauna

There are not many types of creatures on this island but the ones that do live there are bright and colourful.
Some snakes are venomous but are mostly harmless.

See also

 List of lighthouses in Croatia
Korčula
Vis

References

Sources
Babic, K., & E. Rössler (1912) Beobachtungen über die Fauna von Pelagosa. Verhandlungen der kaiserlich-königlichen zoologisch-botanischen Gesellschaft in Wien 62, pp. 220ff.
 Baric, Daniel (2003) Illyrian heroes, Roman emperors, Greek myths: Appropriations and rejections in Dalmatia under Austrian rule (1815-1918). Research project web outline, section III.

Kaiser, Timothy, and Stašo Forenbaher (1999) Adriatic sailors and stone knappers: Palagruža in the 3rd millennium BC.  Antiquity 73 (280), pp. 313–24.
Kaiser, Timothy. "Ancient Mariners of the Adriatic: Archaeological Perspectives on Early Navigation".  Meet the Professors Lecture Series 2007–2008. Orillia Campus, Lakehead University, Orillia, ON. 11 October 2007.

Montanari, A., et al. (2007) Rediscovering pelagosite. Geophysical Research Abstracts 9.
Territori irredenti: L'arcipelago di Pelagosa (anonymous, 2003).

Further reading

External links 

Palagruža Light (Adriatic.hr - Lighthouses - Pictures)
Palagruža Light (Journeys: Croatia - They Keep the Light on for Visitors - Travel - New York Times)

Islands of the Adriatic Sea
Uninhabited islands of Croatia
Lighthouses in Croatia
Nature reserves in Croatia
Protected areas of Croatia
Landforms of Split-Dalmatia County
Archaeological sites in Croatia